Rožna Dolina is one of the four suburbs of the town of Nova Gorica in western Slovenia (the others being Solkan, Kromberk, and Pristava). It is on the border with Italy. Before 1947, it used to be a suburb of the town of Gorizia, which was left to Italy in the Paris Peace Conference of February 1947.

It was the site of one of the major engagements in the Ten-Day War for the independence of Slovenia in June 1991.

The University of Nova Gorica is located in Rožna Dolina.

The largest Jewish cemetery in Slovenia and one of the largest in the Alpe-Adria region is located in Rožna Dolina. Among other graves, it contains the tomb of the Italian philosopher Carlo Michelstaedter.

Lucy Christalnigg, first victim on the Isonzo Front, was a resident of Rožna Dolina. She was on her way back to Rožna Dolina in August 1914, when she was shot by two Landsturm guards at a roadblock.

References

External links

Rožna Dolina on Geopedia

Populated places in the City Municipality of Nova Gorica
Nova Gorica
Italy–Slovenia border crossings